Beluvai  is a village in the southern state of Karnataka, India. It is located in the Moodabidri taluk of Dakshina Kannada district. It is located around 42 km north-east of Mangalore city.

Demographics
 India census, Beluvai had a population of 8,938 with 4,174 males and 4,764 females.

See also
 Dakshina Kannada
 Districts of Karnataka

References

External links
 http://dk.nic.in/

Villages in Dakshina Kannada district
Localities in Mangalore